Frederick Johnson is an American writer known for his work on television soap operas.  He has won five Emmy Awards and five Writers Guild of America Awards.  He is an alumnus of Cornell University.

Positions held
All My Children
Associate Head Writer (Fall 1993 - 1998: hired by Agnes Nixon & Megan McTavish; July 1999 - June 30, 2003: hired by Agnes Nixon)

As the World Turns (hired by Hogan Sheffer)
Associate Head Writer (September 2004 - June 7, 2005)

The Bold and the Beautiful
Script Writer (1989; March 17, 2006 - August 23, 2006: hired by William J. Bell &  Bradley Bell)
Story Consultant (1988–1989; hired by William J. Bell)

Days of Our Lives 
Associate Head Writer (November 24, 2006 - January 24, 2008: hired by Hogan Sheffer)

Guiding Light (hired by James Harmon Brown & Barbara Esensten)
Associate Head Writer (1998–1999)

One Life to Live (hired by Frank Valentini & Brian Frons)
Associate Head Writer (December 22, 2008 - May 24, 2010)

The Young and the Restless
Script Writer (1989–1993)
Story Consultant (1988–1989: hired by William J. Bell)

Awards and nominations
Emmy Awards

NOMINATION 
(2005 & 2006; Best Writing; As The World Turns)
(1995, 1996, 1997, 1998, 1999, 2001–2004; Best Writing; All My Children)
(1999; Best Writing; Guiding Light)
(1992 & 1993; Best Writing; Y&R)

WIN 
(2005; Best Writing; As The World Turns)
(1996, 1997, 1998; Best Writing; All My Children)
(1992; Best Writing; The Young And The Restless)

Writers Guild of America Award

NOMINATION 
(2009, 2010 seasons; One Life to Live)
(2005 season; As The World Turns)
(1995, 1996, 1997, 1998, 1999, 2000, 2001 & 2003 seasons; All My Children)
(1998 season; Guiding Light)

WIN 
(1996, 1998, 2000, 2001, 2003 season; All My Children)

References

American soap opera writers
American male television writers
Writers Guild of America Award winners
Year of birth missing (living people)
Living people
Cornell University alumni